Roorda is a surname. Notable people with the surname include:

Bas Roorda (born 1973), Dutch footballer
Geert Arend Roorda (born 1988), Dutch footballer
Jeff Roorda (born 1965), American politician
Noëlle Roorda, Dutch Paralympic athlete 
Norman Roorda (1928–2012), American politician 
Stephanie Roorda (born 1986), Canadian racing cyclist